Logan Hitzeman (born June 2, 2001) is an American soccer player who plays as a midfielder for South Carolina Gamecocks.

Career

Early career
In 2015, Hitzeman joined the Colorado Rapids academy, competing with the club's youth ranks between the ages of 14 and 19. In 2019, he joined the club's USL affiliate Colorado Springs Switchbacks, taking part in two USL Championship matches for the team. In substitute appearances against LA Galaxy II and the Las Vegas Lights, he registered just 11 total minutes.

College
In November 2018, Hitzeman announced his commitment to play at the University of South Carolina. In his freshman season, Hitzeman made 16 appearances, tallying two assists. Following his sophomore season, he was named to the Conference USA All-Academic team.

In the summer of 2021, Hitzeman played in USL League Two with Colorado-based Flatirons Rush, making two appearances.

References

External links
Logan Hitzeman at USL Championship

2001 births
Living people
American soccer players
Association football midfielders
Colorado Springs Switchbacks FC players
People from Thornton, Colorado
Soccer players from Colorado
Sportspeople from the Denver metropolitan area
USL Championship players
USL League Two players
South Carolina Gamecocks men's soccer players